Senator Carmichael may refer to:

Archibald Hill Carmichael (1864–1947), Alabama State Senate
Gene Carmichael (1927–2014), South Carolina State Senate
Mitch Carmichael (born 1960), West Virginia State Senate
Videt Carmichael (born 1950), Mississippi State Senate